Hans Ludwig David Paul, Graf Yorck von Wartenburg (1 April 1835 – 12 September 1897) was a German lawyer, writer and philosopher.

 Graf (Count) Yorck developed a hermeneutical philosophy of history in exchange with his friend Wilhelm Dilthey. Their correspondence influenced the early Martin Heidegger's philosophy of history, especially central concepts of his early thought and Being and Time such as historicity, generation, and the difference between history as lived (Geschichte) and as an object of inquiry (Historie).

Yorck was a grandson of the Napoleonic-era field marshal Ludwig Yorck von Wartenburg.

Publications 

 Bewusstseinstellung und Geschichte, second edition, Hamburg, 1991.
 Italienisches Tagebuch, Darmstadt 1927.
 Die Katharsis des Aristoteles und der Oedipus Coloneus des Sophokles, Berlin, 1866
 Briefwechsel zwischen Wilhelm Dilthey und dem Grafen Paul Yorck von Wartenburg 1877 - 1897, Reprint Hildesheim 1995.

Further reading 
 Jerzy Krakowski (Hrsg.): Dilthey und Yorck : Philosophie und Geisteswissenschaften im Zeichen von Geschichtlichkeit und Historismus, Wrocław, 1996.
 Karlfried Gründer: Zur Philosophie des Grafen Paul Yorck von Wartenburg, Göttingen, 1970.

External links
 

German philosophers
1835 births
1897 deaths
19th-century philosophers
19th-century German people
Members of the Prussian House of Lords
Paul
Hermeneutists
Philosophers of history
19th-century German writers
19th-century German male writers